The CZ 511 is a semi-automatic .22 LR rifle made by Česká Zbrojovka Uherský Brod at the Česká Zbrojovka Strakonice factory in Strakonice, Czech Republic. They had stopped selling the rifle to the United States at one point, but there became a high demand for them in the US, and they started to import them again. It features a walnut stock, iron sights, an 8-round detachable magazine, and an 11 mm dovetail rail on the receiver to mount a scope on. It also has factory built-in swivels to mount a sling on.

Production of the CZ 511 and CZ 581 ended in 2010, replaced by the CZ 512 range.

External links
 Media Exposure of CZ models
 CZ 511 Product Page

Semi-automatic rifles of Czechoslovakia
.22 LR semi-automatic rifles